The Sunshine Boys is a 1975 American comedy film directed by Herbert Ross and produced by Ray Stark, released by Metro-Goldwyn-Mayer and based on the 1972 play of the same name by Neil Simon, about two legendary (and cranky) comics brought together for a reunion and revival of their famous act. The cast included real-life experienced vaudevillian actor George Burns as Lewis, Walter Matthau as Clark, and Richard Benjamin as Ben, with Lee Meredith, F. Murray Abraham, Rosetta LeNoire, Howard Hesseman, and Ron Rifkin in supporting roles.

Plot
Al Lewis (George Burns) and Willy Clark (Walter Matthau) are two elderly comedians who were once a popular vaudeville comedy act known as "Lewis and Clark" and also called the Sunshine Boys.  After 47 years together, they parted ways 11 years ago on unfriendly terms and have not spoken since.  The break-up was due, in part, to Al's intent to retire and Willy's desire to continue performing.  Willy's nephew, Ben (Richard Benjamin), a talent agent, tries finding work for Willy, which proves difficult because of Willy's age and blustery temperament.

When one of the major networks decides to air a program on the history of comedy and wants the Sunshine Boys to reunite for the show, Ben tries securing the duo's cooperation one last time.  Ben tries managing the individual quirks of two old men in their twilight years, including omitting the abuse and insults each used in discussing the other with him, and diplomatically portraying each as anxious to do the "Doctor Sketch" for an ABC special to give the appearance of harmony.

An attempt to rehearse the "Doctor Sketch" at Willy's apartment starts with the two grudgingly getting reacquainted, but goes only as far as Al entering the doctor's (Willy's) office, before Willy decides to change the scripted, long-established "Come in" to "Enter!"  This results in a loud shouting argument and Al's stormy departure.

Ben has to patch up and salvage the situation, despite the objections of Al's daughter to her father being bothered any more about the special, and manages to get them in the studio.  In the dressing room, they do not speak to each other as persons, just like they did in the last year they did their sketches.  Unpleasantness arises when Willy carelessly dumps makeup jars on Al, followed by Willy's usual trouble with doors, in the dressing room.

After Phyllis Diller finishes her scene and Steve Allen speaks his introduction, the "Doctor Sketch" starts. It flows smoothly until Willy becomes irately inconsolable about Al's 'spitting' during the enunciation of T's and poking him in the chest.  Despite Ben and the studio staff trying to restore order, Willy storms off the set, shouting accusations and decades old bitterness. Al also leaves (finding it impossible to work with the man). In the stairwell, Willy's ongoing temper tantrum results in a serious heart attack.

Willy recovers, first in the hospital, and then at home with a private nurse, with whom he bickers and chides. Ben visits, insisting on Willy's retirement, offering his own home or a NJ actor's retirement home for his convalescence. Serendipitously, Al is moving into the same NJ actor's home, as his daughter is having a second baby and will need his room. The film closes as the two reconcile in Willy's apartment, chatting about mutual theatre friends in Variety magazine.

Cast

Production

Development
Woody Allen originally was asked to direct, but he was more interested in playing the role of Lewis and declined the offer. Twenty years later, he was cast as Lewis in the 1996 television adaptation.

Casting
Initially, Bob Hope and Bing Crosby were proposed for the leads, but Simon was opposed to the idea, as he felt the roles required Jewish comedians. Several actors were considered, and Phil Silvers filmed a screen test.  Eventually, the roles were given to real-life vaudevillian veterans Red Skelton and Jack Benny.

Skelton declined after realizing his income was higher performing his stand-up comedy than what he was offered for the film; he was replaced by the younger Matthau. Benny was forced to withdraw after being diagnosed with the pancreatic cancer that would soon claim him and recommended his friend and fellow real-life vaudevillian veteran Burns, who had not been in a film since 1939, for the role. Burns' Academy Award-winning performance revived his career and redefined his popular image as a remarkably active, older comedy star.

Six weeks before filming started, Burns had triple bypass surgery.

Reception

Box office
The Sunshine Boys was a moderate financial success for MGM but fell short of box-office projections. Frank Rosenfelt, president of MGM, said "I liked it. I thought it was funny. I thought the playing was great. But it didn't work with the public."

Critical

Vincent Canby of The New York Times wrote that with Matthau "at the top of his most antisocial form" and Burns "giving a keenly funny, brilliant straight performance and with Mr. Simon delivering some of his best one-liners, the movie is extremely easy to take. It's only afterward you realize that two complex characters, as well as a unique personal and professional relationship, have been used up—wasted—in the interests of comedy no more substantial than the insults that Willy and Al throw at each other." Arthur D. Murphy of Variety called it "an extremely sensitive and lovable film version of Neil Simon's play, with Walter Matthau and George Burns outstanding in their starring roles as a pair of long-hostile vaudeville partners." Gene Siskel of the Chicago Tribune gave the film two stars out of four and wrote that it "simply provides more of the insult comedy sweeping television. It's a prune-faced 'Odd Couple' without that play's affection for its characters and its characters' affection for each other." Kevin Thomas of the Los Angeles Times called it "one of the year's funniest yet most poignant pictures," adding that "Simon not only wrings much laughter from Lewis and Clark's predicament but also brings us very close to tears." Gary Arnold of The Washington Post called the film "more amusing than one might have expected, probably because Walter Matthau makes a surprisingly funny and plausible old coot." Pauline Kael of The New Yorker wrote, "I'm a very easy laugher, and I didn't laugh once at The Sunshine Boys. The only part of the movie I enjoyed was the footage during the titles—clips of vaudeville headliners from early short subjects and Hollywood Revue of 1929."

Awards and nominations

References

External links
 
 
 
 
 

1975 films
1975 comedy films
American comedy films
American films based on plays
Best Musical or Comedy Picture Golden Globe winners
1970s English-language films
Films about comedians
Films about old age
Films based on works by Neil Simon
Films directed by Herbert Ross
Films featuring a Best Musical or Comedy Actor Golden Globe winning performance
Films featuring a Best Supporting Actor Golden Globe winning performance
Films featuring a Best Supporting Actor Academy Award-winning performance
Films set in New Jersey
Films set in New York City
Films shot in New York City
Films with screenplays by Neil Simon
Metro-Goldwyn-Mayer films
United Artists films
1970s American films